Nasaw may refer to:

 Nasaw as a surname
 David Nasaw, American writer
 Nasaw Indians, another name for the Catawba